From List of National Natural Landmarks, these are the National Natural Landmarks in North Dakota.  There are 4 in total.

References

North Dakota
National Natural Landmarks